Claims of the existence of other moons of Earth—that is, of one or more natural satellites with relatively stable orbits of Earth, other than the Moon—have existed for some time. Several candidates have been proposed, but none have been confirmed. Since the 19th century, scientists have made genuine searches for more moons, but the possibility has also been the subject of a number of dubious non-scientific speculations as well as a number of likely hoaxes.

Although the Moon is Earth's only natural satellite, there are a number of near-Earth objects (NEOs) with orbits that are in resonance with Earth. These have been called "second" moons of Earth or "minimoons".

, an asteroid discovered on 27 April 2016, is possibly the most stable quasi-satellite of Earth. As it orbits the Sun, 469219 Kamoʻoalewa appears to circle around Earth as well. It is too distant to be a true satellite of Earth, but is the best and most stable example of a quasi-satellite, a type of NEO. They appear to orbit a point other than Earth itself, such as the orbital path of the NEO asteroid 3753 Cruithne.

Other small natural objects in orbit around the Sun may enter orbit around Earth for a short amount of time, becoming temporary natural satellites.

History

Petit's moon 
The first major claim of another moon of Earth was made by French astronomer Frédéric Petit, director of the Toulouse Observatory, who in 1846 announced that he had discovered a second moon in an elliptical orbit around Earth. It was claimed to have also been reported by Lebon and Dassier at Toulouse, and by Larivière at Artenac Observatory, during the early evening of March 21, 1846.

Petit proposed that this second moon had an elliptical orbit, a period of 2 hours 44 minutes, with  apogee and  perigee. This claim was soon dismissed by his peers. The  perigee is similar to the cruising altitude of most modern airliners, and within Earth's atmosphere. Petit published another paper on his 1846 observations in 1861, basing the second moon's existence on perturbations in movements of the actual Moon. This second moon hypothesis was not confirmed either.

Petit's proposed moon became a plot point in Jules Verne's 1870 science fiction novel Around the Moon.

Waltemath's moons 
In 1898 Hamburg scientist Dr. Georg Waltemath announced that he had located a system of tiny moons orbiting Earth. He had begun his search for secondary moons based on the hypothesis that something was gravitationally affecting the Moon's orbit.

He also said it did not reflect enough sunlight to be observed without a telescope, unless viewed at certain times, and made several predictions of its next appearances. "Sometimes, it shines at night like the sun but only for an hour or so."

E. Stone Wiggins, a Canadian weather expert, ascribed the cold spring of 1907 to the effect of a second moon, which he said he had first seen in 1882 and had publicized the find in 1884 in the New-York Tribune when he put it forward as probable cause of an anomalous solar eclipse of May of that year. He said it was also probably the "green crescent moon" seen in New Zealand and later in North America in 1886, for periods of less than a half-hour each time. He said this was the "second moon" seen by  Waltemath in 1898. Wiggins hypothesized that the second moon had a high carbon atmosphere but could be seen occasionally by its reflected light.

The existence of these objects put forward by Waltemath (and Wiggins) was discredited after the absence of corroborating observation by other members of the scientific community. Especially problematic was a failed prediction that they would be seen in February 1898.

The August 1898 issue of Science mentioned that Waltemath had sent the journal "an announcement of a third moon", which he termed a wahrhafter Wetter- und Magnet-Mond ("real weather and magnet moon").

Other claims 
In 1918, astrologer Walter Gornold, also known as Sepharial, claimed to have confirmed the existence of Waltemath's moon. He named it Lilith. Sepharial claimed that Lilith was a 'dark' moon invisible for most of the time, but he claimed to be the first person in history to view it as it crossed the Sun.
In 1926 the science journal Die Sterne published the findings of amateur German astronomer W. Spill, who claimed to have successfully viewed a second moon orbiting Earth.

In the late 1960s John Bagby claimed to have observed over ten small natural satellites of Earth, but this was not confirmed.

General surveys 
William Henry Pickering (1858–1938) studied the possibility of a second moon and made a general search ruling out the possibility of many types of objects by 1903. His 1923 article "A Meteoric Satellite" in Popular Astronomy  resulted in increased searches for small natural satellites by amateur astronomers. Pickering had also proposed the Moon itself had broken off from Earth.

In early 1954 the United States Army's Office of Ordnance Research commissioned Clyde Tombaugh, discoverer of Pluto, to search for near-Earth asteroids. The Army issued a public statement to explain the rationale for this survey. Donald Keyhoe, who was later director of the National Investigations Committee on Aerial Phenomena (NICAP), a UFO research group, said that his Pentagon source had told him that the actual reason for the quickly-initiated search was that two near-Earth objects had been picked up on new long-range radar in mid-1953. In May 1954, Keyhoe asserted that the search had been successful, and either one or two objects had been found. At The Pentagon, a general who heard the news reportedly asked whether the satellites were natural or artificial. Tombaugh denied the alleged discovery in a letter to Willy Ley, and the October 1955 issue of Popular Mechanics magazine reported:

At a meteor conference in Los Angeles in 1957, Tombaugh reiterated that his four-year search for natural satellites had been unsuccessful. In 1959, he issued a final report stating that nothing had been found in his search.

Modern status

In 2010, the first known Earth trojan was discovered in data from Wide-field Infrared Survey Explorer (WISE), and is currently called .

In 2011, planetary scientists Erik Asphaug and Martin Jutzi proposed a model in which a second moon would have existed 4.5 billion years ago, and later impacted the Moon, as a part of the accretion process in the formation of the Moon.

In 2018, it was confirmed two dust clouds orbited Earth at the Moon's , known as the Kordylewski clouds.  These were nicknamed "Earth's hidden moons".

The interpretation of some bodies has led to sometimes bold statements in the astronomy press, though often allowing for other interpretations:

Co-orbiting objects
Although no other moons of Earth have been found to date, there are various types of near-Earth objects in 1:1 resonance with it, they orbit at a similar distance as Earth the Sun, rather than the planet itself. Their orbits are unstable, and will fall into other resonances or be kicked into other orbits over thousands of years. The orbit of a satellite of Earth fundamentally depends on the gravity of the Earth–Moon system, whereas the orbit of a co-orbiting object would negligibly change if Earth and the Moon were suddenly removed because a quasi-satellite is orbiting the Sun on an Earth-like orbit in the vicinity of Earth. 

Over time co-orbital objects can be close to or switch between being quasi-satellites. 3753 Cruithne was once nicknamed "Earth's second moon", after its discovery in 1986. Though it turned out that it actually orbits the Sun, being a case of a co-orbiting object with a horseshoe orbit relative to Earth.

Quasi-satellites

Some co-orbiting objects are called quasi-satellites because of their very close orbit and very similar orbital period with Earth, seemingly orbiting Earth.

Earth trojans

Temporary satellites

Computer models by astrophysicists Mikael Granvik, Jeremie Vaubaillon, and Robert Jedicke suggest that these "temporary satellites" should be quite common; and that "At any given time, there should be at least one natural Earth satellite of 1 meter diameter orbiting the Earth." Such objects would remain in orbit for ten months on average, before returning to solar orbit once more, and so would make relatively easy targets for crewed space exploration. Minimoons were further examined in a study published in the journal Icarus.

It has been proposed that NASA search for temporary natural satellites, and use them for a sample return mission.

1913
The earliest known mention in the scientific literature of a temporarily-captured orbiter is by Clarence Chant about the Meteor procession of 9 February 1913:

Later, in 1916, William Frederick Denning surmised that:

2006
On 14 September 2006, an object estimated at 5 meters in diameter was discovered in near-polar orbit around Earth. The asteroid re-entered solar orbit after 13 months and is expected to return to Earth orbit after 21 years.

2015
In April 2015, an object was discovered orbiting Earth, and initially designated , but more detailed investigation quickly showed the object to be the Gaia spacecraft, and the object's discovery soon was retracted.

On 3 October 2015, a small object, temporarily designated WT1190F, was found to be orbiting Earth every ~23 days, and had been orbiting since at least late 2009. It impacted Earth on 13 November 2015 at 06:18:21.7 UTC.

2016
On 8 February 2016 an object ~0.5 meter in diameter was discovered orbiting Earth with a period of 5 days and given the temporary designation XC83E0D, and most likely lost. The object was later identified as the lost artificial satellite SR-11A, or possibly its companion SR-11B, which were launched in 1976 and lost in 1979.

On 8 April 2016, an object, given the temporary designation S509356, was discovered with an orbital period of 3.58 days. Although it has the typical area-to-mass ratio (m2/kg) of satellites, it has a color typical of S-type asteroids. It was later identified as the Yuanzheng-1 stage from the launch of Chinese navigation satellites.

2017
On 8 December 2017, the object YX205B9 was discovered with an orbital period of 21 days, on an eccentric orbit taking it from slightly beyond the geocentric satellite ring to almost twice the distance of the Moon. It was later identified as the booster stage from the Chang'e 2 mission.

2018–2020 
 was discovered in 2020, and orbited around Earth from 2018 to May 2020.

List

Literature 
The writer Jules Verne learned of Petit's 1861 proposal and made use of the idea in his 1870 novel, Around the Moon. This fictional moon was not, however, exactly based on the Toulouse observations or Petit's proposal at a technical level, and so the orbit suggested by Verne was mathematically incorrect. Petit died in 1865, and so was not alive to offer a response to Verne's fictional moon.
 Seun Ayoade's science-fiction adventure Double Bill has a twin-mooned parallel Earth.
 Eleanor Cameron's Mushroom Planet novels for children (starting with the 1954 The Wonderful Flight to the Mushroom Planet) are set on a tiny, habitable second moon called Basidium in an invisible orbit  from Earth. There is an even smaller moon (a captured M-type asteroid) called Lepton orbiting at only .
 The 1956 Tom Swift, Jr. juvenile novel, Tom Swift on the Phantom Satellite, features a new moon entering Earth orbit at  altitude. A 1963 sequel, Tom Swift and the Asteroid Pirates, has the moon Nestria, also called Little Luna, which was originally an asteroid and was moved into Earth orbit at  altitude. It was claimed for the United States and a research base was established there by Swift Enterprises.
 Samuel R. Delany's 1975 novel Dhalgren features an Earth that mysteriously acquires a second moon named George.
 In Haruki Murakami's 2011 novel 1Q84, a second moon, irregularly-shaped and green in color, is visible to some characters in the story.

See also 
 
 
  – second moon in astrology

References

Further reading 
 Research paper describing horseshoe orbits.

 Willy Ley: "Watchers of the Skies", The Viking Press NY, 1963, 1966, 1969
 Carl Sagan, Ann Druyan: "Comet", Michael Joseph Ltd, 1985, 
 Tom van Flandern: "Dark Matter, Missing Planets & New Comets. Paradoxes resolved, origins illuminated", North Atlantic Books 1993, 
 Joseph Ashbrook: "The Many Moons of Dr Waltemath", Sky and Telescope, Vol 28, Oct 1964, p. 218, also on pp. 97–99 of "The Astronomical Scrapbook" by Joseph Ashbrook, Sky Publ. Corp. 1984, 
 Delphine Jay: "The Lilith Ephemeris", American Federation of Astrologers 1983, 
 William R. Corliss: "Mysterious Universe: A handbook of astronomical anomalies", Sourcebook Project 1979, pp. 146–157 "Other moons of the Earth", pp. 500–526 "Enigmatic objects"
 David H. Levy: "Clyde Tombaugh: Discoverer of Planet Pluto", Sky Publishing Corporation, March 2006

 Richard Baum & William Sheehan: "In Search of Planet Vulcan", Plenum Press, New York, 1997 , QB605.2.B38

External links 
 Earth’s Other Moon
 The Earth's Second Moon, 1846–present
 A detailed explanation of secondary moon theories
 Have astronomers discovered Earth's second moon?
 Near-Earth asteroid 3753 Cruithne --Earth's curious companion--  

 
Hypothetical bodies of the Solar System
History of astronomy
Claimed of Earth
Claimed of Earth